Zyras is a genus of beetles in the family Staphylinidae.

Species
These 113 species belong to the genus Zyras:

 Zyras abacus Dvorak, 1984
 Zyras adulescens (Pace, 1987)
 Zyras alboantennatus Pace, 1986
 Zyras alboterminalis Pace, 2008
 Zyras alternans (Cameron, 1925)
 Zyras angkoricola Pace, 2004
 Zyras bartolozzii Pace, 2003
 Zyras basilewskyi Last, 1956
 Zyras beijingensis Pace, 1993
 Zyras benenensis Pace, 2001
 Zyras birmanus Scheerpeltz, 1965
 Zyras biroi Last, 1980
 Zyras bonus Last, 1977
 Zyras bramtonus Last, 1962
 Zyras britannorum Pace, 1992
 Zyras bryanti Cameron, 1943
 Zyras castaneus (Motschulsky, 1861)
 Zyras championi Cameron, 1939
 Zyras chinkiangensis Bernhauer, 1939
 Zyras chumphonensis Pace, 2004
 Zyras collaris (Paykull, 1789)
 Zyras coloratus Cameron, 1939
 Zyras condignus Last, 1969
 Zyras conjectus Last, 1960
 Zyras cultus Last, 1960
 Zyras cylindricornis Dvorak, 1981
 Zyras daiaccorum Pace, 2008
 Zyras distinctus Bierig, 1937
 Zyras drescheri Cameron, 1939
 Zyras drugmandi Pace, 2004
 Zyras elegantulus Cameron, 1939
 Zyras exasperatus Schubert, 1908
 Zyras facundus Last, 1969
 Zyras ferrugineiventris Scheerpeltz, 1965
 Zyras ferrugineus Cameron, 1939
 Zyras fl avorufus Cameron, 1939
 Zyras fratrumkadooriorum Pace, 1998
 Zyras fugax (Sharp, 1888)
 Zyras fulgidus (Gravenhorst, 1806)
 Zyras fustigans Pace, 2000
 Zyras gardneri Cameron, 1939
 Zyras geminus (Kraatz, 1859)
 Zyras glabricollis Scheerpeltz, 1965
 Zyras gratellus Cameron, 1939
 Zyras hastatus Fauvel, 1904
 Zyras hauserianus Bernhauer, 1933
 Zyras haworthi (Stephens, 1832)
 Zyras hirsutiventris (Champion, 1927)
 Zyras hirsutus Cameron, 1943
 Zyras hirtus (Kraatz, 1859)
 Zyras hongkongensis Pace, 1999
 Zyras illecebrosus Last, 1982
 Zyras indicus Cameron, 1944
 Zyras iridescens (Sawada, 1970)
 Zyras kambaitiensis Scheerpeltz, 1965
 Zyras kinabaluensis Pace, 2008
 Zyras kraatzi Schubert, 1908
 Zyras louwerensi Cameron, 1939
 Zyras maculipennis Gridelli, 1921
 Zyras malaisei Scheerpeltz, 1965
 Zyras manjushri Pace, 1992
 Zyras matangensis Cameron, 1943
 Zyras montanus (Bernhauer, 1915)
 Zyras mortuorum Pace, 1990
 Zyras morvani Pace, 1986
 Zyras mutarensis Pace, 1996
 Zyras nakuruensis Pace, 1996
 Zyras nigerrimus Cameron, 1943
 Zyras nigritus Last, 1980
 Zyras nigroaeneus Cameron, 1939
 Zyras nilgiriensis Cameron, 1939
 Zyras nitens Cameron, 1944
 Zyras notaticornis Pace, 1998
 Zyras obliquus (Casey, 1893) i c g b
 Zyras optatus (Sharp, 1888)
 Zyras optimus Cameron, 1939
 Zyras paecesanus Pace, 1997
 Zyras paederinus Pace, 2008
 Zyras pallipes Pace, 1992
 Zyras pallipyga Pace, 2008
 Zyras papuanus Pace, 2000
 Zyras parageminus Pace, 1988
 Zyras particornis (Sharp, 1888)
 Zyras perforatus (Champion, 1921)
 Zyras pervariolosus Pace, 2008
 Zyras pictus (Sharp, 1874)
 Zyras pindarae (Champion, 1921)
 Zyras planctos Last, 1977
 Zyras planifer (Casey, 1893) i c g
 Zyras preangeranus Cameron, 1939
 Zyras proximus Cameron, 1939
 Zyras pseudobirmanus Scheerpeltz, 1965
 Zyras punctipennis Cameron, 1939
 Zyras punctus Last, 1967
 Zyras quadriterminalis Pace, 2008
 Zyras quasar Dvorak, 1996
 Zyras restitutus Pace, 1993
 Zyras rudis (LeConte, 1866) i c g b
 Zyras rufescens Cameron, 1939
 Zyras rufi cauda Cameron, 1939
 Zyras semiasperatus Scheerpeltz, 1965
 Zyras seminigerrimus Bernhauer, 1933
 Zyras setosipennis Scheerpeltz, 1965
 Zyras setosivestis Scheerpeltz, 1965
 Zyras shaanxiensis Pace, 1998
 Zyras shiva Pace, 1987
 Zyras sibiricus Bernhauer, 1914
 Zyras song Pace, 1993
 Zyras songanus Pace, 1993
 Zyras tambachensis Pace, 1996
 Zyras thaiorum Pace, 1986
 Zyras variolatus Pace, 2003
 Zyras wei Pace, 1993

Data sources: i = ITIS, c = Catalogue of Life, g = GBIF, b = Bugguide.net

References

Aleocharinae genera
Beetles of Europe